Clinton Township is one of thirteen townships in Putnam County, Indiana. As of the 2010 census, its population was 1,275 and it contained 840 housing units.

Geography

Unincorporated towns
 Clinton Falls at 
 Morton at 
 Portland Mills at 
 Van Bibber Lake at 
(This list is based on USGS data and may include former settlements.)

References

External links
 Indiana Township Association
 United Township Association of Indiana

Townships in Putnam County, Indiana
Townships in Indiana